National Assembly elections were held in Estonia between 12 and 14 December 1936. As the activities of all parties were suspended, only individual candidates were allowed to run. Candidates affiliated with the pro-government Patriotic League ran in all 80 constituencies, in only 30 were they contested by one or more opposition candidates. Voter turnout was 57.8%.

Results

References

Estonia
1936 in Estonia
Election and referendum articles with incomplete results